Vinalhaven School is a kindergarten-through-twelfth-grade public school located at 22 Arcola Lane, Vinalhaven, an island located in mid-coast Maine, 75 miles east northeast of Portland.  Vinalhaven School is divided into five teams: the K-2 Team, 3-5 Team, Middle School Team, High School Team and Discovery Team. The Discovery Team consists of the drama, music, art, physical education and technology departments.

Athletics
Vinalhaven School is a member of the East/West Conference, which is a group of Class D schools in Maine. Vinalhaven School teams include Men's and Women's Basketball; Men's and Women's Soccer; Cross Country; Men's Baseball; Women's Softball, and the Rowing Crew. In 2007 the Lady Vikings Basketball team  were the runners-up of the Western Maine Class D Finals, and Men's Vikings Soccer were the runners-up of the Western Maine Class D Finals. Vikings Crew placed first in Boston's Ice Breaker in 2005, 2007 and 2008.  In 2010, the Men's Vikings Basketball team were the runners-up of the Western Maine Class D Finals.

References

External links
 Vinalhaven School

Schools in Knox County, Maine
Public high schools in Maine
Public middle schools in Maine
Public elementary schools in Maine
Vinalhaven, Maine